Marco Fión (born 17 January 1947) is a Guatemalan footballer. He competed in the men's tournament at the 1976 Summer Olympics.

References

1947 births
Living people
Guatemalan footballers
Guatemala international footballers
Olympic footballers of Guatemala
Footballers at the 1976 Summer Olympics
Aurora F.C. players
Place of birth missing (living people)
Association football midfielders